Whitton railway station was a railway station, built by the North Lindsey Light Railway in Whitton, Lincolnshire. It was the northern terminus of the line from Scunthorpe (Dawes Lane) railway station. It opened in 1907 and closed for passengers in 1925 and goods in 1951.

The railway company built a pier on the River Humber which gave the Gainsborough–Hull packet steamer an additional calling point, utilised three times weekly.

References

External links
 "Whitton, North Lincolnshire – notes on the history of a village".

Disused railway stations in the Borough of North Lincolnshire
Railway stations in Great Britain opened in 1907
Railway stations in Great Britain closed in 1925
Former Great Central Railway stations